The second USS Vigilant (YT-25) was a United States Navy tug commissioned in 1898 and stricken in 1927. The vessel was constructed in 1881 at Philadelphia, Pennsylvania as George W. Pride and began service in San Francisco, California the same year. With the onset of the Spanish–American War, the tugboat was acquired by the United States Navy in April 1898 and remained in service until 1927.

Service history
Vigilant was laid down in 1881 by William Cramp & Sons of Philadelphia, Pennsylvania and completed in 1888 as the iron-hulled commercial steam screw tug George W. Pride. Cramp delivered her to the John D. Spreckels Brothers' Company of San Francisco, California, that year.

The United States Navy acquired her from the John D. Spreckels Brothers' Company at the outset of the Spanish–American War in April 1898, and commissioned her as USS Vigilant on 6 April 1898. Vigilant was stationed in the San Francisco region from 1898 to 1927, operating either at the Yerba Buena Naval Station or the Naval Training Station, San Francisco.

When the U.S. Navy instituted its modern hull number system on 17 July 1920, she was classified as a "district harbor tug" and designated YT-25. Vigilants decommissioning date is uncertain. She was stricken from the Navy List on 26 November 1927 and sold to the Gary Davis Tug and Barge Company of Seattle, Washington, on 25 April 1928.

Notes

References
 
 Department of the Navy Navy History and Heritage Command Online Library of Selected Images: U.S. Navy Ships: USS Vigilant (1898–1928, later YT-25)
 NavSource Online: USS Vigilant (YT-25)

Tugs of the United States Navy
Spanish–American War auxiliary ships of the United States
World War I auxiliary ships of the United States
Ships built by William Cramp & Sons
1888 ships